Danyang is a county-level city located on the southwest (right) bank of the Yangtze River, and is under the administration of Zhenjiang, Jiangsu province, China. It is noted for the production of optical lenses used in sunglasses and eyeglasses. Danyang locals speak a dialect of Wu Chinese, and the city is on the linguistic borderline between Wu Chinese and Jianghuai Mandarin.

History
During the period of the four Southern Dynasties (Nan Chao) from 420 to 589 A.D. when China's national capital was in Jiankang (modern Nanjing), Danyang was the hometown of the emperors of the Southern Qi (479-502) and Liang Dynasties (502-557), who were buried in the countryside outside the city.  Today 11 of these Southern Dynasties imperial tombs can still be found to the east and northeast of the city. They are notable for their unique stone statues of mythical animals marking the sacred way (shen dao) leading to each imperial tomb.

Administrative divisions
In the present, Danyang City has 13 towns and 1 other.
13 towns

1 Other
 Danyang Economic and Technological Development Zone

Climate

Economy
As one of the key cities in the Yangtze River Delta open to foreign trade, Danyang has shown strong economic and standard-of-living growth since 2000. In 2007, the GDP and per capita GDP of Danyang reached 35.7 billion yuan (US$4.7 billion) and 44,242 yuan (US$6,061) respectively. Danyang's economy was 16th in a 2010 ranking of China's top county-level cities.

Businesses from 32 countries and regions have invested in Danyang with accumulated paid-in capital of US$1 billion. As a developing city within the Shanghai economic sphere of influence, Danyang has attracted domestic and foreign businesses. The main industries in Danyang are prescription eyewear, tools and hardware, and automobile parts.

Spectacles City
The Spectacles City, located in Danyang, is one of the largest eyeglass merchandise centers in China. Built in 1986, the market center's construction occurred in three phases. It subsequently merged with the Huayang Spectacles and Yunyang Spectacles markets. It covers an area of over 344,445 square feet (32,000 square meters).

Education

Schools
 

Jiangsu Danyang Senior High School

Transport
China National Highway 312

Railway stations
There are three railway stations in Danyang: 
 Danyang Railway Station, actually two separate, adjacent, but unconnected stations. The old station is served by regular trains on the Huning Railway. The new station is served by high-speed trains on the Huning Intercity High-Speed Railway (between Nanjing and Shanghai). 
 Danyang North Railway Station, north of the city, which is served by high-speed trains on the Jinghu High-Speed Railway (between Shanghai and Beijing). Danyang North station is at the beginning of the Danyang–Kunshan Grand Bridge, currently the longest bridge in the world.

The high-speed trains (typically, listed in schedules as G-series or D-series trains) take about an hour and a half to get to Shanghai and about 30 minutes to get to Nanjing, the provincial capital. Direct service to Beijing from Danyang North Station takes about 4 hours and 30 minutes.

Local food 
Danyang is known for its barley gruel and huangjiu (yellow wine), which has traditional medicinal properties.

Tourist attractions
Kaitai Bridge is a historic stone arch bridge in the city.

References

External links

Government website of Danyang 
Danyang City English guide (Jiangsu.NET)

Cities in Jiangsu
County-level divisions of Jiangsu
Zhenjiang